Seminole State College may refer to:

 Seminole State College of Florida
 Seminole State College (Oklahoma)